Waitresses Wanted is a 2008 Canadian drama film starring Clara Furey, Janaina Suaudeau and Colm Feore. It was written and directed by Guylaine Dionne.

Plot 
Priscilla Paredes, a Brazilian native takes a job as a stripper in order to stay in Montreal after her student visa expires.

Cast 
 Janaina Suaudeau as Priscilla
 Clara Furey as Milagro
Colm Feore as Sergeant Conner
Anne Dorval as Milagro's mother

References

External links
 

2008 films
2008 drama films
Canadian drama films
Quebec films
French-language Canadian films
2000s Canadian films